Teron is an OC Transpo Transitway Station in Ottawa, Ontario. The station is located in the suburb of Kanata on Campeau Drive just east of the intersection with Teron Road from which it takes its name, which in turn was named after William Teron, who was responsible for developing Kanata. It is near the  western off-ramp of Highway 417 at March Road and an overpass north of Eagleson Station and Park and Ride. Teron was officially included in the Transitway system in the 2007 fall schedules.

The main purpose of the new Transitway facility according to OC Transpo's Transplan program as the result of public consultation process on transit improvement was to improve connections between local routes in Kanata North and routes 63 and 64, which travel to the Kanata North Business Park from Lebreton Station and Lincoln Fields Station. Other routes, such as route 62, route 164 (serving Hope Side Road), and route 168 (serving Beaverbrook and Bridlewood serve Teron Station, and routes 62, 164, and 168 all provide a connection to Kanata Centrum at Terry Fox Station from routes 63 and 64 in Kanata North.

Additionally, Teron will be part of a future extension of the Western Segment of the Transitway. According to the Ottawa Transportation Master Plan, the segment from Eagleson Road to Terry Fox Drive is scheduled to be completed by 2031.

Service

The following routes serve Teron station as of October 6, 2019:

See also
 Ottawa Rapid Transit
 OC Transpo
 Kanata, Ontario

References

External links

2007 establishments in Ontario
Transitway (Ottawa) stations